Luis Alberto Jara Cantillana (born in Santiago, Chile, on October 25, 1965), or simply known as Lucho Jara, is a Chilean singer, television host and former actor. He has participated in the teleseries De cara al mañana playing as Juan José "El Turco" Aguad, and Los títeres from Canal 13, as Pato.

Biography 
Son of Luis Jara Vergara and Alba Rosa Cantillana, his road to the TV began when he participated in the show Sabados Gigantes', in a section named "El Clan Infantil", where take part singers, actors and dancers.

Later, he participated as actor in the soap opera De cara al mañana from Televisión Nacional de Chile in 1982; after that would come his participation in the successful teleserie Los títeres from Canal 13 in 1984. In 1985, he won a festival in the stellar TV show Martes 13 with the song Ámame. To this success, adds the song Me hace falta, with which he gets the second place in the Viña del Mar International Song Festival in 1986. This some year he records his first album Ámame.

Successively, followed by the Otra vez de cero (1988) and Inevitable (1990). Later, he would add to the repertoire for to make his first recital, Concierto de Antología. The album Un Golpe de Suerte 1992 shows a mature, trusted artist, competent for to perform a high quality and sizable show, with which he walks Chile.

In 1995, he starts as TV host in Chilevisión, with the show ¿Cuánto vale el show?. Because to be considered as "TV promise". Jara makes two stellars TV show in the channel, too: De aquí no sale and Calor humano, enduring in Chilevisión to December 2002.

To Un Golpe de Suerte was followed by the production Emociones, that includes a heartfelt tribute to his father (deceased on October 25, 1992), next to the pianist Raúl Di Blasio. Two years later he published Para que no me olvides and in 1998 Lo Nuestro Ayer y Hoy.

In 2002 he records his self-titled album and he release his single Mañana, which it becomes a success. This same year, he signs contract with Canal 13, when makes debut in 2003 as TV host of La Movida del Festival (satellite TV show of Viña del Mar International Song Festival), and later he hosted with the comedian Álvaro Salas the TV show Vértigo. His consecration in TV arrives from stellar TV show Mucho Lucho, when he hosted his own comedian and talk show in prime time.

In 2003, he published his album Mi Destino, and two years after he makes Tanto amor.

On March 1, 2007, he debuts in the new morning TV show of Canal 13, Juntos, El show de la mañana, with Eli de Caso and Karla Constant. The low rating of the TV show, added to its bad review, derived in disclaimer from Luis Jara in Canal 13 at the end of 2008, it's the last appearance in the matinal TV show Juntos, on December 24 of this same year.

In 2008, he releases his new album Swing, where presents covers of sings from years 1970 and 1980, in a close to jazz, blues and swing style. In 2009, he joins MEGA, where he debuts in the TV show Morandé con compañía on March 20 of this year, and he hosted his first TV show Un golpe de Lucho. The first semester of 2010, he was the TV host of the stellar TV show Elígeme in the Wednesdays. In 2011, he was TV host and backstage during auditions for the stellar talent show Yo soy..., from MEGA.

In November 2011, he hosted the talent and game TV show Coliseo romano, and on February 29, 2012, he begins to host the first season of Tu cara me suena.

On March 19, 2012, he began to host the game TV show Salta a la vista.

On May 25, 2013, his mother deceased by cancer.

Actually, Luis hosted the matinal TV show Mucho gusto.

 Television 
 Soap operas 
 De Cara al Mañana (1982 – Televisión Nacional de Chile) as Juan José Aguad, the "Turco"
 Los Títeres (1984 – Canal 13) as Patricio "Pato"

 TV Show 
 1995 – ¿Cuánto vale el show? (Chilevisión)
 1996–2001 – De aquí no sale (Chilevisión)
 2000–2002 – Calor Humano (Chilevisión)
 2003; 2006; 2008 – La movida del Festival (Canal 13)
 2003–2008 – Vértigo (Canal 13)
 2003–2006 – Mucho Lusho (Canal 13)
 2007–2008 – Juntos, el Show de la mañana (Canal 13)
 2009 – Un golpe de Lusho Mega
 2009–2011 – Morande con compañía Mega
 2010–2011 – Elígeme Mega
 2011–2012 – Yo Soy Mega
 2011 – Coliseo romano Mega
 2012 – Tu cara me suena Mega
 2012 – Salta a la vista Mega
 2013– 2018; 2019 – Mucho gusto Mega

 Discography 

 Studio albums 
 1986: Ámame 1988: Otra vez de cero 1990: Inevitable 1992: Un golpe de suerte 1997: Emociones 1998: Para que no me olvides 1999: Lo nuestro... de ayer y hoy 2002: Luis Jara 2005: Tanto amor 2008: Swing 2010: Villancicos: Un regalo en navidad 2011: Late fuerte 2014: Cerca 2018: La Última Tentación 2022: Toda Una Vida Compilation albums 
2005: Grandes éxitos2015: Jara: 30 años Live albums 
2003: Mi destino2007: Luis Jara: 20 años2010: Grandes éxitos en vivo Video albums 
2004: Mi destino en vivo2007: 20 años, el concierto2010: Grandes éxitos en vivo Singles 

 Filmography 
 1996 – Bienvenida Cassandra''

Premios y nominaciones

References

External links 
 
 
 Luis Jara Singer Academy

1965 births
Living people
21st-century Chilean male singers
Singers from Santiago
Chilean people of Spanish descent
Chilean television presenters